Agapito Jiménez Zamora  (May 24, 1817 – September 17, 1879) was a Costa Rican politician. He was an alternate member of the House of Representatives (1844–1846) and the Constituent Assembly of 1846–1847, deputy substitute for Carthage (1848–1849), Deputy owner by Carthage (1849–1852), Minister Conjuez of the Supreme Court of Justice of Costa Rica (1858–1859), alternate member for San José in the House of Representatives (1860–1862), he was first appointed to the Presidency (1863–1864), and was appointed a second time for the Presidency (1869–1870) and Governor of the Province of San José (May 1869).

Vice presidents of Costa Rica
1817 births
1879 deaths
Foreign ministers of Costa Rica